St. John's College

St John’s College is an independent co-educational P-12 school, founded on the Greek Orthodox tradition. Initially established in North Carlton in 1979, the college moved to its current location in Preston in 1984. The college was founded to provide education of Greek culture and religion to Melbourne’s large Greek community. Today it accepts students from a wide range of cultures, whilst remaining under the auspices of the Greek Orthodox Archdiocese of Australia.

St John’s College provides a vibrant and stimulating learning environment for its students. It emphasises the importance of each student doing their personal best whilst developing self-esteem and responsibility for their place in the wider community.

Over recent years, St John’s College has undergone significant refurbishment, including the addition of a new Centre for the Environment, Technology and Sustainability, with brand new science labs. In 2016 it won The Educator Innovative Schools Award for achieving improved learning outcomes for its senior students.

The emblem
The motto, written in Ancient Greek : "ΑΙΕΝ ΑΡΙΣΤΕΥΕΙΝ" (A-in aris-TEV-in) means "Forever Excelling". The emblem of the school includes the official emblem of the Eastern Orthodox Church, The Two Headed Eagle.

References

External links
St. John's Greek Orthodox College website
Schools Choice

Educational institutions established in 1979
Private primary schools in Victoria (Australia)
Private secondary schools in Victoria (Australia)

1979 establishments in Australia